The 2017 Bryant Bulldogs football team represented Bryant University during the 2017 NCAA Division I FCS football season. They were led by first-year head coach James Perry and played their home games at Beirne Stadium. They were a member of the Northeast Conference. They finished the season 6–5, 4–2 in NEC play to finish in a tie for second place.

Schedule

References

Bryant
Bryant Bulldogs football seasons
Bryant Bulldogs football